Coleophora rosaefoliella is a moth of the family Coleophoridae. It is found in North America, including Kentucky and Ontario.

The larvae feed on the leaves of Rosa species.

References

rosaefoliella
Moths of North America
Moths described in 1864